Libero is an Italian word meaning "free". It can refer to:

People:
 Libero (given name)
 Libero, codename of World War II partisan leader Riccardo Fedel (1906-1944)

Vehicles:
 Hyundai Libero, a series of light trucks 
 Mitsubishi Libero, the Japanese market name of the Mitsubishi Lancer station wagon
 Subaru Sumo, a microvan known as the Libero in some markets
 Yamaha Libero (G5), a motorcycle from India Yamaha Motor

Other uses:
 Libero (ISP), an Italian internet service provider
 Libero, an alternate name for the Italian film Along the Ridge (aka Anche libero va bene)
 Libero (newspaper), an Italian daily newspaper
 Libero (magazine), Finnish political youth magazine
 Libero (football), a more versatile type of centre back in football (soccer)
 Libero (volleyball), a player specialized in defensive skills in volleyball
 Libero (diapers), a brand of diapers marketed by Essity
 Libero-Tarifverbund, a tariff network in Switzerland